Daniel Orts (10 January 1924 – 5 November 2013) was a French racing cyclist. He rode in the 1948 Tour de France.

References

External links
 

1924 births
2013 deaths
French male cyclists
Sportspeople from Hérault
Cyclists from Occitania (administrative region)